Abu Qubays is a sacred mountain which resides on the eastern frontier of Al-Masjid Al-Haram in Makkah, in the Hejazi region of Saudi Arabia.

Description

Although the exact origin of its name is unknown, it is believed to be called Al-Amīn in pagan times because the sacred Black Stone resided there according to Muslims. According to another report, this mountain was also called the Maghārat al-Kanz ("Treasure Cave"), and this was believed to be the place where the first of men stayed and were buried after their death. According to tradition, this is the place where the Islamic Nabi, Prophet Muhammad performed the miracle of splitting the moon into two pieces and then re-attaching those pieces as demanded by the disbelievers of Makkah.

See also
 Geography of Saudi Arabia
 Pilgrimage
 Hajj
 'Umrah

References

External links

 Jabal Abu Qubais (Mount Abu Qubais) (Islamic Landmarks)
 Jabal Abu Qubais (Hajj & Umrah Planner)
 8 Facts about the Mountain of Abu Qubais – the first mountain created by Allah
 7 facts of Mountain Abu Qubais - The first Mount created by Almighty Allah
 Makkah Live Drone View | Jabal abu qubais | Makkah Live | Reality Of Islam (YouTube)
 jabal abu qubais
 Jabal e Abu Qubais Kahan Hai - Maulana Ilyas Qadri - Short Bayan
 جبال مكة | جبل أبو قبيس (Arabic)

Mountains of Saudi Arabia